North Sunderland is a fishing village on the coast of Northumberland, England, and adjacent to Seahouses. The population of the civil parish was 1,803 at the 2001 census, increasing to 1,959 at the 2011 Census.

Etymology
The name North Sunderland may be of Old English origin, and differently-derived to the much larger Sunderland 60 miles to its south. The first element is sūðer, meaning "south, southern", while the second is land, "land". The name means "southern-land", and is analogous in its derivation to Sutherland in Scotland.

History  
Historically, the inland village of North Sunderland grew significantly when the nearby coast was developed as a harbour.  Houses were built, particularly in connection with the herring fishery.  Community growth became concentrated around these sea-houses, eventually being recognised under the name Seahouses.  In practice, there is no recognisable boundary between the two.

Governance 
 North Sunderland  and  Seahouses are within the civil parish of North Sunderland and the Northumberland County Council electoral division of Bamburgh, The parliamentary constituency is Berwick-upon-Tweed, represented by MP Anne-Marie Trevelyan (Conservative).

References

External links

 Information on North Sunderland
 Tide times for North Sunderland at the BBC
 The friendly and useful community website for both Seahouses and North Sunderland.

Villages in Northumberland
Populated coastal places in Northumberland